Nothing Has Ever Happened Here is a 2016 Iranian documentary film written and directed by Ayat Najafi.

References

2016 films
2016 documentary films
2010s Persian-language films
Films set in Tehran
Films shot in Tehran
Films directed by Ayat Najafi
Documentary films about war
Documentary films about Iran
Iranian documentary films